Nicholas Muller (November 15, 1836 – December 12, 1917) was an American banker and politician who served four different stints as a United States representative from New York during the late 19th and early 20th century. In all, he served five terms in office.

Life
Born in Differdange, Luxembourg, he attended the common schools in the city of Metz and afterward the Athénée de Luxembourg. He immigrated to the United States with his parents, who settled in New York City, and was employed as a railroad ticket agent for more than 20 years. He was one of the promoters and original directors of the Germania Bank in New York City.

He was a member of the New York State Assembly (New York Co., 1st D.) in 1875 and 1876. He was a member of the State central committee in 1875, and was elected as a Democrat to the 45th and 46th United States Congresses, holding office from March 4, 1877, to March 4, 1881. During the latter Congress he was Chairman of the Committee on Expenditures in the Department of the Interior. He was again elected to the 48th and 49th United States Congresses, holding office from March 4, 1883, to March 4, 1887; in both Congresses he was chairman of the Committee on Militia.

Muller was appointed President of the Metropolitan Police Board in 1888. He subsequently served as president of the excise board and as quarantine commissioner. He was again elected to the 56th and 57th United States Congresses, holding office from March 4, 1899, until his resignation on November 22, 1901. He was an unsuccessful candidate for Staten Island borough president in 1901, and was appointed as tax commissioner in 1904. He died in New Brighton, Staten Island in 1917, aged 81, and was interred in Green-Wood Cemetery.

References

1836 births
1917 deaths
American people of Luxembourgian descent
People from Staten Island
Democratic Party members of the New York State Assembly
Burials at Green-Wood Cemetery
Alumni of the Athénée de Luxembourg
People from Differdange
Luxembourgian emigrants to the United States
Democratic Party members of the United States House of Representatives from New York (state)
19th-century American politicians